The Castro of Sacóias is a former fortified settlement and archeological site in the civil parish of Baçal, municipality of Bragança in the Alto Trás-os-Montes subregion of the Portuguese Norte Region.

History
It is likely that the site was constructed during the Iron Age, and restructured over time. It was occupied by Roman settlers during the Roman occupation of the Iberian peninsula.

During the second half of the 18th century, the then-existing religious temple was moved from the Castro to the main settlement, to substitute an older chapel, then housing a baptismal fountain and conserving the Blessed Sacrament.

The Castro, and group of existing structures, are of individual importance that resulted in it being designated a National Monument in 1910, as well as a structure of municipal interest by the council of Bragança.

Architecture
The site is located on an isolated, rural hilltop rising over the Chapel of Nossa Senhora da Assunção. It consists of a destroyed fortified settlement, with small walls constructed with small stones, in addition to remnants of tiles, bricks and millstones. Most of the artefacts unearthed from the site was collected by the Sociedade Martins Sarmento, and presented at the Municipal Museum of Bragança and Archaeological Museum.

References

Notes

Sources
 
 

Sacoias
Iron Age Portugal
Buildings and structures in Bragança, Portugal
Castro Sacoias
Buildings and structures in Bragança District